The Pied Pipers is an American popular singing group originally formed in the late 1930s. They had several chart hits through the 1940s, both under their own name and in association with Tommy Dorsey, with Johnny Mercer and with Frank Sinatra.

Origins
Originally they consisted of eight members who had belonged to three separate groups: Jo Stafford from The Stafford Sisters, and seven male singers: John Huddleston, Hal Hopper, Chuck Lowry, Bud Hervey, George Tait, Woody Newbury, and Dick Whittinghill, who had belonged to two groups named The Four Esquires and The Three Rhythm Kings, all of whom were contributing to the 1938 movie Alexander's Ragtime Band. Multi-instrumentalist Spencer Clark was also a member at one point.

Paul Weston and Axel Stordahl, who were arrangers for Tommy Dorsey's big band, heard of the group through two of The King Sisters, Alyce and Yvonne. Weston had a jam session at his home and a visiting advertising executive signed the octet for Dorsey's radio program, broadcast in New York City. They sang with Dorsey's orchestra for about six weeks before a British representative of the sponsor objected to some of the songs in their repertoire and fired them. They went back to California, but in the time they had been in New York had recorded two records for RCA Victor Records.

Chicago quartet
While in Los Angeles, the group was reduced to a quartet: Jo Stafford, her then-husband John Huddleston, and Chuck Lowry from the original eight, and Billy Wilson. They were getting little work, however, and were on the threshold of disbanding when they received a call from Tommy Dorsey (in Chicago). Dorsey said he could not afford to hire eight Pipers but would be happy to have them join him if they could cut the number down to a quartet. As they had already done that, and with only one unemployment check remaining, they were happy to comply.

In 1939, they moved to Chicago, with Clark Yocum, who had played guitar and sung for Dorsey, replacing Wilson. Although Paul Weston left Dorsey to become Dinah Shore's music director about that time, he was to figure in the fortunes of the group again.

In 1940, Dorsey hired another vocalist, Frank Sinatra, who had previously sung in a quartet, The Hoboken Four, and later with Harry James' orchestra. Sinatra and the Pipers teamed to record a major hit, "I'll Never Smile Again", in that year. The group had twelve more chart hits with Dorsey, ten of them with Sinatra. Also, Jo Stafford herself had a solo hit, "Yes Indeed", in 1941.

Los Angeles years
Around Thanksgiving 1942, Tommy Dorsey (who was prone to incidents of bad temper) became angry at one of the Pipers for sending him in the wrong direction at a railroad station in Portland, Oregon, and fired him. The Pipers, out of "team loyalty," resigned en masse. At that moment, the #1 record on the charts was "There Are Such Things" sung by Frank Sinatra and the Pied Pipers, the last RCA record they did with Dorsey.

They returned to Los Angeles and signed with Capitol Records, where Paul Weston was now working, and he became the arranger and orchestra leader for most of the Pipers' recordings. Huddleston left to join the war effort (also about that time, he was divorced from Jo Stafford), and Hal Hopper rejoined the group to replace him. The group also backed Johnny Mercer on a number of sides.  And in 1944 Jo Stafford had a hit on her own, ahead of the Pipers, and after a couple more hits, she left for good to pursue a solo career. She was replaced in May by June Hutton, who had been singing with the Stardusters.

The Pipers had twelve charted hit singles on Capitol, including "Dream" and ending with "My Happiness" (biggest hit version by Jon and Sondra Steele, later made popular again by Connie Francis) in 1948. They also continued a relationship with Frank Sinatra, doing several tours with him starting in 1945 and becoming a regular on his radio program from 1945 to 1947.

Radio
In 1944, The Pied Pipers were regulars on Johnny Mercer's Chesterfield Music Shop on the NBC Radio Network Monday through Friday nights.
Beginning March 30, 1948, the group became a part of Club Fifteen on CBS. They sang on the program's Tuesday and Thursday episodes, alternating with The Andrews Sisters, who sang on Mondays, Wednesdays, and Fridays.

Modern

In 1950, June Hutton left the group and was replaced by Sue Allen and later by Virginia Marcy. (However, the trade publication
Billboard reported that Virginia Maxie replaced Hutton in December 1949.) Hutton married Axel Stordahl, the other half of Dorsey's original arranging team. Just as Jo Stafford (who had married Paul Weston) had her husband's orchestra accompany her on her solo hits, June Hutton's solo hits on Capitol in the 1950s featured Stordahl's orchestra as backing group.

Louanne Hogan, who was the dubbed singing voice behind several movie stars, was briefly a member of The Pied Pipers in 1951. Lee Gotch, who had sung in the 1940s with the swing group Six Hits and a Miss, joined the Pied Pipers from 1954 to 1967, during which time he recorded an LP by Lee Gotch's Ivy Barflies.

The Pied Pipers sang on a few tracks of Frank Sinatra's 1950s studio albums, backed up Sam Cooke on his #1 hit, "You Send Me", and made a guest appearance on I Love Lucy.

Current
The current Pied Pipers are Nancy Knorr, Don Lucas, Kevin Kennard, and Chris Sanders. The group frequently performs with the Jimmy Dorsey Orchestra.

Recognition
In both 1944 and 1945, The Pied Pipers won awards from Down Beat magazine as the best and most popular group of the year. The group was inducted into the Vocal Group Hall of Fame in 2001.

References

External links
Pied Pipers Homepage
Tribute to The Pied Pipers
'The Pied Pipers' Vocal Group Hall of Fame Page

American vocal groups
Vocal quartets
Capitol Records artists
King Records artists
RCA Victor artists
Jo Stafford
American jazz ensembles from California
Vocal jazz ensembles
Traditional pop music singers
Hep Records artists